Andrew Curry (born 2 July 1972, Melbourne) is an Australian producer and actor who has appeared in many television drama and comedy series, and in feature films.

One of Curry's most notable roles was Larry Woodhouse in Neighbours, a recurring role he played from 2000 to 2002.  He was also a film reviewer on the Foxtel show Premiere in 2002.

He is the brother of Stephen Curry and Bernard Curry, who have also made a significant number of appearances on Australian television.

In 2007 he founded iCandy Productions with business partner Cameron Nugent, and has made numerous short films, music videos and corporate presentations. In 2010 he was awarded funding to produce a short film, Spider Walk through Film Victoria's 'Propellor Shorts' funding scheme. In September 2010, it was announced that Curry would be reprising his role as Woody in Neighbours. Numerous producer roles have since followed, with 2017 marking the completion of his debut feature film, A Boy Called Sailboat, written and directed by long-time collaborator Cameron Nugent.

Other skills possessed by Curry are editing, graphic effects, and music composition and performance.

In 2017/18 he spent time in Montana, USA, as a producer on the period feature film Robert The Bruce. 

2018 saw him tour the live soundtrack performance of the feature film A Boy Called Sailboat with the Grigoryan Brothers around Australia.

References

External links
Profile at ABC Flipside

1972 births
Living people
Comedians from Melbourne
Australian male television actors
Australian male film actors
Australian male comedians